Sérgio Ferreira may refer to:

 Sérgio Henrique Ferreira (1934–2016), Brazilian physician and pharmacologist
 Sérgio Ferreira (writer) (1946–2006), Portuguese-Cape Verdean writer and filmmaker